Joseph Ignatius Lang (February 4, 1911 – November 13, 1990) was an American boxer who competed in the 1932 Summer Olympics.

He was born in Lovelock, Nevada and died in Santa Clara, California.

In 1932 he finished fourth in the bantamweight class. After losing in the semi-finals to Hans Ziglarski he was not able to compete in the bronze medal bout against José Villanueva.

1932 Olympic results
Below is the record of Joseph Lang, an American bantamweight boxer who competed at the 1932 Los Angeles Olympics:

 Round of 16: defeated Sabino Tirado (Mexico) on points
 Quarterfinal: defeated Carlos Pereyra (Argentina) by walkover
 Semifinal: lost to Hans Ziglarski (Germany) on points
 Bronze Medal Bout: lost to José Villanueva (Philippines) by walkover

External links
profile

1911 births
1990 deaths
People from Lovelock, Nevada
Boxers from Nevada
Bantamweight boxers
Olympic boxers of the United States
Boxers at the 1932 Summer Olympics
American male boxers